The Football South Australia (FSA), formerly known as Football Federation South Australia (FFSA), is the governing body of football (also known as soccer) in South Australia, established in 2006.

Description
Football South Australia are affiliated with Football Australia, the national governing body. The Federation run the highest levels of football in South Australia: The National Premier Leagues South Australia, State League 1 South Australia and State League 2 South Australia. Below these three leagues, they run in association to South Australia's regional competitions and amateur competitions. Most teams from these various leagues compete in the Federation Cup, which also decides the South Australian representatives for the Australia Cup. Football South Australia also manage the Junior Premier League (JPL) and Junior State League (JSL), where teams from age groups, ranging from under 6s to under 17s, compete on Sundays.

History
The first South Australian football organistation was the South Australian British Football Association (SABFA), founded in 1902. The first official South Australian football competition was contested in 1903, between the three teams of North Adelaide, South Adelaide and Woodville. In 1924, the name of the association was changed to the South Australian Soccer Football Association (SASFA), In 1961, the association split into SASFA and the South Australian Soccer League (SASL). The next year, they reformed into the South Australian Soccer Federation (SASF). This name remained until 2006 when the current Football South Australia was formed, with the name Football Federation South Australia (FFSA). Following the renaming of Football Federation Australia to Football Australia in 2020, South Australia's federation became Football South Australia.

Clubs

Men's teams
Port Adelaide Pirates are the oldest surviving team in South Australia being founded in 1903, and competing in the 1904 season. In 1933, Birkalla Rovers were founded, which would later amalgamate with a West Torrens team to form West Torrens Birkalla. Alongside Adelaide University, these are the only South Australian clubs with history dating back to before World War II. Following World War II, Australia was a particular hotspot for immigration by those who had been displaced by the war. These immigrants would found multiple clubs that have survived to the current day: Juventus in 1946, Beograd in 1949, Polonia in 1950, Croatia in 1952, Napoli in 1958 and Hellas in 1962. Other notable clubs founded during this period that are now defunct are: Burnside Budapest, which later merged with Campbelltown City to become Campbelltown Budapest and Ukrainian SC Lion, which later merged with Port Adelaide to become Port Adelaide Lion, and now continue to participate in the South Australian Amateur Soccer League. Adelaide City are the most successful club in history, having won 3 National Soccer League championships, 19 first division championships and 18 Federation Cups. Clubs can apply to enter the State League 2 competitions when a space is available, with the team being in one of the regional leagues or the amateur league. The most recent teams to have joined being Pontian Eagles in 2020, Modbury Vista in 2017, Fulham United and Vipers FC both in 2016, the latter two having won promotion to State League 1.

Junior Premier League and Junior State League clubs participate in junior football, with teams ranging from U6 to U17. The seniors participate in the Amateur League or Regional Leagues.

Women's teams

League system

The soccer pyramid in South Australia comprises 4 levels below the A-League Men, with promotion and relegation between the top 3 levels. It also includes the South Australian Amateur Soccer League, which is not officially apart of the league system. In total, there are 34 divisions in South Australia.

Men's pyramid

Season winners

Performance by club
Over the history of South Australian football, 26 different clubs have won the title. The most successful club is Adelaide City, with 19 titles to its credit, 7 of those coming since their return from the National Soccer League in 2004.

Clubs in bold currently play in the top division, and clubs in italics no longer compete in semi-professional competitions or are defunct.

All Time First Division Ladder
The following shows every team who has participated in the first division, from 1903 up to and including 2022. Teams in bold are competing in the first division in 2023.

References

External links
 

South
Soccer in South Australia
Sports governing bodies in South Australia
2005 establishments in Australia
Sports organizations established in 2005